Puka Punta (Quechua puka red, punta peak; ridge, "red peak (or ridge)", also spelled Pucapunta) is a mountain in the Cordillera Negra in the Andes of Peru.

It is located in the Ancash Region, Huaylas Province, Mato District, and in the Santa Province, Cáceres del Perú District. Puka Punta lies southeast of a mountain and lake named Qarwaqucha.

References

Mountains of Peru
Mountains of Ancash Region